Unfaithful Mornings is a Canadian drama film, directed by François Bouvier and Jean Beaudry and released in 1989. An exploration of the creative process, the film stars Denis Bouchard as Jean-Marc, a photographer undertaking a project in which he photographs the same street corner each morning at 8 a.m., and Beaudry as Marc, a novelist who is writing a fiction work based on the photographs.

Bouvier and Beaudry received a Genie Award nomination for Best Director at the 11th Genie Awards.

References

External links

1989 films
Canadian drama films
Films shot in Montreal
Films set in Montreal
Films directed by Jean Beaudry
French-language Canadian films
1980s Canadian films